The 2010 San Marino and Rimini Riviera motorcycle Grand Prix was the twelfth round of the 2010 Grand Prix motorcycle racing season. It took place on the weekend of 3–5 September 2010 at the Misano World Circuit.
The event was marred by the death of Shoya Tomizawa from injuries sustained in a crash during the Moto2 race.

Death of Shoya Tomizawa
During the 12th lap of the Moto2 race, Shoya Tomizawa was riding in fourth position in a seven-bike pack. The pack consisted of Toni Elías who was leading the race, followed by Simone Corsi, Julián Simón, Tomizawa, Alex de Angelis, Scott Redding and Jules Cluzel. As the pack approached Turn 11, the very fast right-hander that is taken nearly flat out, Tomizawa lost control and crashed. He was thrown off his bike and onto the track, and de Angelis and Redding who were right behind both hit the Japanese rider at full speed. de Angelis walked away from the crash uninjured, but Redding and Tomizawa were taken to the medical center, the Japanese's conditions appearing critical; despite this, the race was not stopped.

Tomizawa was then rushed from the medical center to the hospital in Riccione, where he was pronounced dead at 14.20 local time, due to the injuries sustained in the crash.

MotoGP classification

Moto2 classification

125 cc classification

Championship standings after the race (MotoGP)
Below are the standings for the top five riders and constructors after round twelve has concluded.

Riders' Championship standings

Constructors' Championship standings

 Note: Only the top five positions are included for both sets of standings.

References

San Marino and Rimini Riviera motorcycle Grand Prix
San Marino
San Marino and Rimini
Motorcycle racing controversies